Variimorda fagniezi is a species of tumbling flower beetles in the subfamily Mordellinae of the family Mordellidae.

Subspecies
Variimorda fagniezi fagniezi Méquignon, 1946
Variimorda fagniezi therondi Méquignon, 1946

References

External links
 Biolib
 Fauna Europaea

Mordellidae
Beetles of Europe
Beetles described in 1946